Dobruševo is a village in the Mogila Municipality of North Macedonia, and is located at . It used to be a municipality of its own and its FIPS code was MK26.

Demographics
According to the 2002 census, the village had a total of 624 inhabitants. Ethnic groups in the village include:

Macedonians 624

References

Villages in Mogila Municipality